Elachista adempta is a moth of the family Elachistidae. It is found in North America in  Alberta, Saskatchewan, Colorado, Nebraska, Nevada, Utah and Wyoming.

The length of the forewings is 4–6.3 mm. The ground colour of the forewings is white, usually with a brownish spot in the middle of the wing at the fold and another similar spot at two-thirds of the wing. The hindwings are whitish to light grey and the underside of the wings is grey.

References

Moths described in 1948
adempta
Moths of North America